The US state of Michigan is home to two types of lizards, nineteen types of snakes and eleven types of turtles, all members of the class Reptilia. Reptiles are found throughout Michigan, although the only venomous species, the eastern massasauga rattlesnake, is seen only in the Lower Peninsula. Reptiles are cold-blooded, and so usually pass the cold winters of Michigan in frost-free areas, such as burrows (for snakes and land-dwelling turtles) or the bottoms of lakes and streams (for water-dwelling turtles). Most reptiles in Michigan are protected by state law, but many are still at risk due to human encroachment on their habitats, the draining of wetlands and, in the case of snakes, indiscriminate killing by fearful humans. In 1995, the painted turtle was named as Michigan's state reptile.

Reptile habitats in Michigan are generally split into four regions: the northern and southern Lower Peninsula and the eastern and western Upper Peninsula, with differentiations based on climate, soils, underlying bedrock and glacially-derived landforms. Region one, the southern Lower Peninsula, is generally characterized by a warmer, less variable climate. Loam and clay soils dominate the region, with a lesser amount of sand. Deciduous hardwoods are the dominant tree species, with some natural prairies and savannas. There is a greater diversity of plant life in this region, and it includes plant and animal species that are not found in any of the other regions. Region two, the northern Lower Peninsula, has a climate that is cooler and more variable, with greater precipitation due to its proximity to the Great Lakes, more extensive uplands and more northern latitude. Sandy soils and glacial deposits are the dominant soil type, while forests of conifer or mixed conifer and hardwood predominate. Swamps and bogs are found more often in region two than region one. Region three, the eastern Upper Peninsula, has a climate profile similar to region two. Sand and clay dominate the soil of this region, which tends to be low in nutrients and poorly drained. There are extensive wetlands, dominated by coniferous forests, while upland areas provide mixed conifer and broadleaf hardwood tracts. Region four, the western Upper Peninsula, provides extensive bedrock structures. The temperature is less moderate than in the other three regions, and can see frigid winters and hot summers. Mixed conifer and broadleaf forests again dominate.

Three species of reptiles are considered to be threatened and two species are endangered – these are protected under the Endangered Species Act of the State of Michigan. Six more species are considered to be of special concern, though not protected under the act. The copperbelly water snake is listed as threatened by the federal government, while the eastern massasauga rattlesnake is a candidate species to be included on the US endangered species list.

Lizards

Snakes

Turtles

See also
List of fauna of Michigan

References
General references
 

Specific references

Reptiles
Michigan